Zhivar (also Romanized as Zhīvar; also known as Jīvar) is a village in Sarab Bagh Rural District, Sarab Bagh District, Abdanan County, Ilam Province, Iran. According to 2006 census, its population was 717, in 132 families. The village is populated by Kurds.

References 

Populated places in Abdanan County
Kurdish settlements in Ilam Province